Siamoporus deharvengi is a species of aquatic beetle in the family Dytiscidae, the only species in the genus Siamoporus. It is only known from a cave in the Khon Kaen Province, Thailand, and like other cave-adapted beetles it has reduced pigment, and lacks eyes and functional wings. Siamoporus is a member of Hydroporini and it is not easily separated from some of the other cave-living species in this tribe.

References

Dytiscidae